Orzelec Mały  is a village in the administrative district of Gmina Łubnice, within Staszów County, Świętokrzyskie Voivodeship, in south-central Poland.

The village has a population of  97.

Demography 
According to the 2002 Poland census, there were 90 people residing in Orzelec Mały village, of whom 54.4% were male and 45.6% were female. In the village, the population was spread out, with 26.7% under the age of 18, 30% from 18 to 44, 20% from 45 to 64, and 23.3% who were 65 years of age or older.
 Figure 1. Population pyramid of village in 2002 — by age group and sex

References

Villages in Staszów County